Lagoon Boy is a fictional superhero published by DC Comics. His name and appearance are references to the title character from the classic horror feature film Creature from the Black Lagoon.

Publication history
Lagoon Boy first appeared in Aquaman vol. 5 #50 (December 1998) and was created by Erik Larsen.

Fictional character biography
No writer has yet provided an origin story for Lagoon Boy. In his first appearance, he is allowed into Atlantis as part of an attempt by Aquaman to make Atlantis more open to those living outside the city by granting them citizenship. His presence is met with protests by many elitist Atlanteans. Lagoon Boy comes to the citizenship ceremony on the day of Aquaman and Queen Mera's marriage. While there he befriends Blubber, a humanoid whale with a genius IQ, and his assistant Sheeva the Mermaid. Aquaman #54 reveals that the three characters have begun calling themselves "The Land-Lovers" as they were underwater creatures who were fascinated with the world over water. Blubber creates a device which allows Atlanteans to view television from the surface world, and the trio head up to the surface world in order to explore and compare it to the television broadcasts they had seen. Their appearance creates a huge disturbance and the Coast Guard is quickly called. Aquaman rescues the Land-Lovers from persecution and sends them back to Atlantis.

After Erik Larsen's run on Aquaman ended, the Land-Lovers did not reappear in the title. Lagoon Boy was used shortly before the end of Larsen's run by writer Chuck Dixon, who wrote the Young Justice Special #1 (No Man's Land) story. In the story, the male members of Young Justice (Superboy, Robin and Impulse), head for Gotham City and meet Lagoon Boy. They join together to stop Kobra. Lagoon Boy reappears in Young Justice: Sins of Youth, where he is aged to adulthood. He helps Young Justice against Klarion the Witchboy and Black Manta, and he assists the JSA, JLA and the Titans in ending the wild mixture of science and magic which had been causing the transformations.

Lagoon Boy later displays the ability to command, or at least enlist the aid of, humpback whales in order to cause a riptide on the shores of the rogue nation of Zandia, aiding Young Justice in the process. Robin and Lagoon Boy team up to stop a sea monster from damaging Gotham Harbor and force its return to the sea. Lagoon Boy was briefly shown in Infinite Crisis when The Spectre wreaks havoc on the people of Atlantis. He is shown fighting the Spectre alongside many Atlanteans and their allies. Lagoon Boy is one of the few survivors after Spectre squashes the city.

Over a year after Young Justice disbands, Lagoon Boy is recruited alongside several other obscure teenaged heroes as part of a Teen Titans spin-off team known as the Titans East. He and the rest of the Titans are severely injured after being attacked by the children of Trigon on a routine training exercise.

In a scene taking place just hours prior to the events of Blackest Night, Lagoon Boy's former teammate Hawk II visits Titans Tower and angrily tells Cyborg that Lagoon Boy is still in a coma.

In 2011, DC Comics rebooted the DC Universe in "The New 52". Lagoon Boy appeared as a member of the Teen Titans five years in the future.

During the "Heroes in Crisis" storyline, Lagoon Boy is seen at Sanctuary where he is dealing with the trauma of the deaths when a mysterious assailant massacred his teammates in the Titans East team. He is among the heroes who were killed by a mysterious assailant and was found with a knife in his chest.

Powers and abilities
Lagoon Boy is an amphibious boy. He is small in stature, but  strong, quick and durable. His body is covered in green scales and fins and he has sharp claws and teeth. When excited, Lagoon Boy also has the ability to blow up like a puffer fish, which makes him appear to be much larger and more intimidating, making him physically more powerful and develop quills that can cause great pain to other opponents who cross his path. 

Lagoon Boy discovers a conch horn that allows him to call out to his Spotty, a monstrous animal from the undersea trench called the Devil's Deep. Lagoon Boy has also displayed the ability to command humpback whales. At this point, it is unclear just how much control he has over them. He could also conjure and mold water into any shape he saw fit, using it as a jettison device to reach a flying Powerboy.

While not a superpower per se, he also has access to wealth acquired from submerged ships and cities.

Other versions

Earth One
In Teen Titans: Earth One Vol. 2, Lagoon Boy is a new member of the Titans.

In other media

Television
Lagoon Boy, also known as La'gaan, appears in Young Justice, voiced by Yuri Lowenthal. Introduced in the second season, this version is a student at the Conservatory of Sorcery, a member of the Team, estranged friend of Aqualad, and boyfriend of Miss Martian who displays a romantic rivalry with her ex-boyfriend Superboy. Later in the season, Miss Martian starts to rekindle her relationship with Superboy and eventually breaks up with Lagoon Boy, having realized she was using him as a rebound boyfriend. As of season three, Lagoon Boy has left the Team, returned to Atlantis, and joined the royal guard. In season four, he is revealed to be bisexual, in a three-way polyamorous marriage, and raising a baby. Later in the season, he is elected to join the Justice League as the new Aquaman.

Miscellaneous
 A variation of Lagoon Boy appears Teen Titans Go! #52 as an alternate alias of Robby Reed after his H-Dial borrows Aqualad's powers.
 Lagoon Boy appears in issue #14 of the Young Justice tie-in comic.

References

External links
 

Characters created by Erik Larsen
Comics characters introduced in 1998
DC Comics Atlanteans
DC Comics characters who are shapeshifters
DC Comics characters who can move at superhuman speeds
DC Comics characters with superhuman strength
DC Comics LGBT superheroes
DC Comics superheroes
DC Comics television characters
DC Comics telepaths
Fictional bisexual males
Fictional characters with superhuman durability or invulnerability
Fictional empaths
LGBT characters in animated television series
Young Justice (TV series)